Maria Mitrosz (born 1970 in Białystok, Poland) is a Polish soprano.

In 1995, she graduated with distinction from the faculty of vocal music at the Fryderyk Chopin Academy of Music in Warsaw under Professor Janina Skalik. She attended master courses under Teresa Żylis-Gara, and Carlo Bergonzi.

External links
Biography in Polish, accessed 4 March 2009
Opera Poznan biography in Polish, accessed 4 March 2009

1970 births
Living people
Polish operatic sopranos
People from Białystok
21st-century Polish singers
21st-century Polish women singers